Providence Primitive Baptist Church is a historic Primitive Baptist church in Walter Hill, Tennessee.

It was built in 1867 and added to the National Register in 2000.

References

Baptist churches in Tennessee
Churches on the National Register of Historic Places in Tennessee
Churches completed in 1867
19th-century Baptist churches in the United States
Churches in Rutherford County, Tennessee
National Register of Historic Places in Rutherford County, Tennessee